The women's 1000 meter at the 2012 KNSB Dutch Single Distance Championships took place in Heerenveen at the Thialf ice skating rink on Saturday 5 November 2011. Although this tournament was held in 2011, it was part of the speed skating season 2011–2012.

There were 22 participants.

Title holder was Marrit Leenstra.

Statistics

Result

Draw

Source:

References 

Single Distance Championships
2012 Single Distance
World